The Nethalloor Sri Bhagavathi temple is located near Karukachal, in the district of Kottayam, Kerala state, India. Changanasserry-vazhoor & Kottayam-Punalur state highways meet in Nethalloor junction; 19 km from Kottayam in Karukachal route and 16 km from Changanasserry in Vazhoor route.

This is one of the famous Durga Bhagavathi shrines in Kerala. The prathikshta of Bhagavathi durga is in the bhava of Mahishasuramardini. It is one of the beautiful "chathurbahu" Bhagavathi "prathishta" in Kerala.

The main festival of this temple is "Thrikkarthika maholsavam" in the month of " vrischikam"(nov-dec)and the other one is "navarathri".

Sri Paramboor illathu Neela kandan bhattathirippadu  is the chief priest(Thanthri) of this temple and Champakara NSS karayogom is taking care of this temple.

Hindu temples in Kottayam district
Devi temples in Kerala
Changanassery